The West Indian lanternshark (Etmopterus robinsi) is a shark of the family Etmopteridae found in the western central Atlantic, at depths between .

Reproduction is ovoviviparous.

References

Compagno, Dando, & Fowler, Sharks of the World, Princeton University Press, New Jersey 2005 

Etmopterus
Taxa named by Pamela J. Schofield
Taxa named by George H. Burgess
Fish described in 1997